Wanrong railway station is a railway station located in Fenglin, Hualien, Taiwan. It is located on the Taitung line and is operated by the Taiwan Railways Administration. It is named after nearby Wanrong Township.

The former Wansen line to Mt. Lintian, operated by the Forestry Bureau, used to terminate here.

References

1914 establishments in Taiwan
Railway stations in Hualien County
Railway stations opened in 1914
Railway stations served by Taiwan Railways Administration